The United Nations Security Council Resolution 2342 was unanimously adopted on 23 February 2017. The resolution  renewed sanctions against individuals and entities engaging in acts that threatened the peace and stability of Yemen until 26 February 2018.  The resolution prohibited the sale, supply and transfer of weapons to these individuals and entities, as well as to former Yemeni President Ali Abdullah Saleh, Houthi commanders Abdullah Yahya al Hakim and Abd al-Khaliq al-Huthi. The Security Council expressed concern at the situation and ongoing violence in Yemen. The council also extended the mandate of the Panel of Experts on Yemen until 28 March 2018.

See also 
 List of United Nations Security Council Resolutions 2301 to 2400

References

External links 
 Resolution 2342 (2017)

United Nations Security Council resolutions concerning Yemen
 2342
2017 in Yemen